Pitolisant, sold under the brand name Wakix among others, is a medication for the treatment of excessive daytime sleepiness in adults with narcolepsy. It is a histamine 3 (H3) receptor antagonist/inverse agonist. It represents the first commercially available medication in its class. Pitolisant enhances the activity of histaminergic neurons in the brain that function to improve a person's wakefulness.

The most common side effects include difficulty sleeping, nausea, and feeling worried.

The U.S. Food and Drug Administration (FDA) considers it to be a first-in-class medication.

Medical uses 
Pitolisant (Wakix) is used in adults for the treatment of narcolepsy. Narcolepsy is a chronic sleep disorder that causes overwhelming daytime drowsiness. Pitolisant (Ozawade) is indicated to improve alertness and reduce excessive daytime sleepiness in adults with obstructive sleep apnea.

Side effects 
The most common side effects include insomnia (difficulty sleeping), headache, nausea (feeling sick), anxiety, irritability, dizziness, depression, tremor, sleep disorders, tiredness, vomiting, vertigo (a spinning sensation) and dyspepsia (heartburn). Serious but rare side effects are abnormal loss of weight and spontaneous abortion.

History 
Pitolisant was developed by Jean-Charles Schwartz, Walter Schunack, and colleagues after the former discovered the H3 receptor. It was the first H3 receptor inverse agonist to be tested in humans or introduced for clinical use. It is marketed in the European Union by Bioprojet Pharma. It was approved for medical use in the European Union in March 2016.

The FDA approved pitolisant for excessive daytime sleepiness in participants with narcolepsy based primarily on evidence from two trials (Trial 1/NCT01067222, Trial 2/NCT01638403). An additional trial (Trial 3/NCT01800045), in which participants with a different type of narcolepsy were exposed to the same dose of pitolisant, was used to add data for evaluation of side effects. The trials were conducted in Europe and South America.

The two primary trials enrolled adults with narcolepsy and excessive daytime sleepiness. Participants received pitolisant, placebo, or an approved drug for narcolepsy for eight weeks. For participants receiving pitolisant, the dose could be increased during the first three weeks but had to remain the same for the next five weeks. Neither the participants nor the healthcare providers knew which treatment was being given during the trial.

The benefit of pitolisant was evaluated by comparing changes in daytime sleepiness during the trial between pitolisant- and placebo-treated participants. To measure the daytime sleepiness, the investigators used a scale called the Epworth Sleepiness Scale (ESS). The ESS asks participants to rate the likelihood that they would fall asleep while doing eight daily activities (such as sitting and reading or watching television). Participants rate each item from zero (would never doze) to three (high chance of dozing).

Pitolisant was approved by the U.S. Food and Drug Administration (FDA) in August 2019. It was granted orphan drug designation for the treatment of narcolepsy, fast track designation for the treatment of excessive daytime sleepiness  and cataplexy in people with narcolepsy, and breakthrough therapy designation for the treatment of cataplexy in people with narcolepsy.

References

External links
 
 
 
 

Chloroarenes
CYP2D6 inhibitors
Ethers
H3 receptor antagonists
1-Piperidinyl compounds
Stimulants
Orphan drugs